Timonium station may refer to two stops in the Baltimore Light RailLink system:
 Timonium Business Park station (Light RailLink), currently advertised as Timonium
 Timonium Fairgrounds station (Light RailLink), currently advertised as Fairgrounds